The Western Force Women are an Australian rugby union team that competes annually in the Super W competition, and are based in Perth, Western Australia. They have competed in every edition of Super W since its official launch in 2018. They played under the name RugbyWA from 2019 to 2020.

History 
The team played as the Western Force Women in the inaugural season of the Super W competition, finishing third overall. They played under the name RugbyWA during the 2019 and 2020 seasons after their re-branding. The side returned to their "roots" by wearing the traditional black and gold state colours.

They returned to playing under the Western Force name in 2021 as a newly structured Super W team, in an effort to increases support for the women’s game in Western Australia. With RugbyWA administering the "operational and logistical aspects in a collaborative approach". The Western Force did not complete the 2021 season but opted to pull out of the Super W competition after the first round due to the worsening COVID-19 situation in New South Wales.

Current squad 
On 8 February 2022, the squad for the 2022 season was announced.

Season standings 
Super W

 {| class="wikitable" style="text-align:center;"
! style="width:20px;" |Year
! style="width:20px;" |Pos
! style="width:20px;" |Pld
! style="width:20px;" |W
! style="width:20px;" |D
! style="width:20px;" |L
! style="width:20px;" |F
! style="width:20px;" |A
! style="width:40px;" |+/-
! style="width:20px;" |BP
! style="width:20px;" |Pts
! text-align:left;" | Play-offs
|-
|2020
|5th
|4
|0
|0
|4
|41
|184
|–143
|2
|2
| align="left" | Did not compete
|-
|2019
|4th
|4
|1
|0
|3
|53
|86
|–33
|1
|6
| align="left" | Did not compete
|-
|2018
|3rd
|4
|2
|0
|2
|154
|87
| +67
|2
|10
| align="left" | Did not compete
|}

Coaching Staff 

 Assistant Coach: Callum Payne
 Assistant Coach: Hayden Croghan
 Female High Performance Pathways Manager: Claudia Bell

References

External links 

 Official website

2017 establishments in Australia
Rugby clubs established in 2017
Women's rugby union teams in Australia
Super W
Rugby union teams in Western Australia
Sporting clubs in Perth, Western Australia
Western Force